Elam José "Rico" Rossy Ramos (born February 16, 1964) is an American former professional baseball player. He played all or parts of four seasons in Major League Baseball (MLB) as a utility infielder for the Atlanta Braves, Kansas City Royals, and the Seattle Mariners.

Amateur career
Rossy attended Purdue University, where he played college baseball for the Boilermakers from 1982–1985.

Professional career
Rossy was drafted by the Baltimore Orioles in the 33rd round of the 1985 MLB draft. He was traded along with minor-league shortstop Terry Crowley, Jr. from the Orioles to the Pittsburgh Pirates for Joe Orsulak on November 6, 1987. Then in 1990 he was traded again, this time to the Braves for Greg Tubbs. He debuted with the Braves on September 11, 1991. The next year, the Braves traded him to the Royals for Bobby Moore. He played with the Royals for two years, but never played in more than 60 games. For the next several years, Rossy bounced between organizations in the minors before resurfacing in the majors again with the Seattle Mariners in 1998. He played his last game in the majors that year on September 27, 1998.

References

External links 

1964 births
Living people
American expatriate baseball players in Canada
Atlanta Braves players
Buffalo Bisons (minor league) players
Charlotte O's players
Greenville Braves players
Harrisburg Senators players
Kansas City Royals players
Las Vegas Stars (baseball) players
Major League Baseball players from Puerto Rico
Major League Baseball second basemen
Major League Baseball shortstops
Major League Baseball third basemen
Miami Marlins (FSL) players
Newark Orioles players
Omaha Royals players
Ottawa Lynx players
Puerto Rican expatriate baseball players in Canada
Purdue Boilermakers baseball players
Richmond Braves players
Seattle Mariners players
Sportspeople from San Juan, Puerto Rico
Tacoma Rainiers players
Anchorage Glacier Pilots players